Henry Purcell (rare:   September 1659 – 21 November 1695) was an English composer.  

Purcell's style of Baroque music was uniquely English, although  it incorporated Italian and French elements. Generally considered among the greatest English opera composers, Purcell is often linked with John Dunstaple and William Byrd as England's most important early music composers. No later native-born English composer approached his fame until Edward Elgar, Ralph Vaughan Williams, Gustav Holst, William Walton and Benjamin Britten in the 20th century.

Life and work

Early life

Purcell was born in St Ann's Lane, Old Pye Street, Westminster – the area of London later known as Devil's Acre, a notorious slum – in 1659. Henry Purcell Senior, whose older brother Thomas Purcell was a musician, was a gentleman of the Chapel Royal and sang at the coronation of King Charles II of England. Henry the elder had three sons: Edward, Henry and Daniel. Daniel Purcell, the youngest of the brothers, was also a prolific composer who wrote the music for much of the final act of The Indian Queen after his brother Henry's death. The family lived just a few hundred yards west of Westminster Abbey from 1659 onwards.

After his father's death in 1664, Purcell was placed under the guardianship of his uncle Thomas, who showed him great affection and kindness. Thomas arranged for Henry to be admitted as a chorister. Henry studied first under Captain Henry Cooke, Master of the Children, and afterwards under Pelham Humfrey, Cooke's successor. The composer Matthew Locke was a family friend and, particularly with his semi-operas, probably also had a musical influence on the young Purcell. Henry was a chorister in the Chapel Royal until his voice broke in 1673 when he became assistant to the organ-builder John Hingston, who held the post of keeper of wind instruments to the King.

Career
Purcell is said to have been composing at nine years old, but the earliest work that can be certainly identified as his is an ode for the King's birthday, written in 1670, when he was eleven. The dates for his compositions are often uncertain, despite considerable research.  It is assumed that the three-part song Sweet tyranness, I now resign was written by him as a child. After Humfrey's death, Purcell continued his studies under Dr John Blow. He attended Westminster School and in 1676 was appointed copyist at Westminster Abbey. Henry Purcell's earliest anthem, Lord, who can tell, was composed in 1678. It is a psalm that is prescribed for Christmas Day and also to be read at morning prayer on the fourth day of the month.

In 1679, he wrote songs for John Playford's Choice Ayres, Songs and Dialogues and an anthem, the name of which is unknown, for the Chapel Royal. From an extant letter written by Thomas Purcell we learn that this anthem was composed for the exceptionally fine voice of the Rev. John Gostling, then at Canterbury, but afterwards a gentleman of His Majesty's Chapel. Purcell wrote several anthems at different times for Gostling's extraordinary basso profondo voice, which is known to have had a range of at least two full octaves, from D below the bass staff to the D above it. The dates of very few of these sacred compositions are known; perhaps the most notable example is the anthem They that go down to the sea in ships. In gratitude for the providential escape of King Charles II from shipwreck, Gostling, who had been of the royal party, put together some verses from the Psalms in the form of an anthem and requested Purcell to set them to music. The challenging work opens with a passage which traverses the full extent of Gostling's range, beginning on the upper D and descending two octaves to the lower.

Between 1680 and 1688 Purcell wrote music for seven plays. The composition of his chamber opera Dido and Aeneas, which forms a very important landmark in the history of English dramatic music, has been attributed to this period, and its earliest production may well have predated the documented one of 1689. It was written to a libretto furnished by Nahum Tate, and performed in 1689 in cooperation with Josias Priest, a dancing master and the choreographer for the Dorset Garden Theatre. Priest's wife kept a boarding school for young gentlewomen, first in Leicester Fields and afterwards at Chelsea, where the opera was performed. It is occasionally considered the first genuine English opera, though that title is usually given to Blow's Venus and Adonis: as in Blow's work, the action does not progress in spoken dialogue but in Italian-style recitative. Each work runs to less than one hour. At the time, Dido and Aeneas never found its way to the theatre, though it appears to have been very popular in private circles. It is believed to have been extensively copied, but only one song was printed by Purcell's widow in Orpheus Britannicus, and the complete work remained in manuscript until 1840 when it was printed by the Musical Antiquarian Society under the editorship of Sir George Macfarren. The composition of Dido and Aeneas gave Purcell his first chance to write a sustained musical setting of a dramatic text. It was his only opportunity to compose a work in which the music carried the entire drama. The story of Dido and Aeneas derives from the original source in Virgil's epic the Aeneid. During the early part of 1679, he produced two important works for the stage, the music for Nathaniel Lee's Theodosius, and Thomas d'Urfey's Virtuous Wife. 

In 1679, Blow, who had been appointed organist of Westminster Abbey 10 years before, resigned his office in favour of Purcell. Purcell now devoted himself almost entirely to the composition of sacred music, and for six years severed his connection with the theatre. He had probably written his two important stage works before taking up his new office.

Soon after Purcell's marriage in 1682, on the death of Edward Lowe, he was appointed organist of the Chapel Royal, an office which he was able to hold simultaneously with his position at Westminster Abbey. His eldest son was born in this same year, but he was short-lived. His first printed composition, Twelve Sonatas, was published in 1683. For some years after this, he was busy in the production of sacred music, odes addressed to the king and royal family, and other similar works. In 1685, he wrote two of his finest anthems, I was glad and My heart is inditing, for the coronation of King James II. In 1690 he composed a setting of the birthday ode for Queen Mary, Arise, my muse and four years later wrote one of his most elaborate, important and magnificent works – a setting for another birthday ode for the Queen, written by Nahum Tate, entitled Come Ye Sons of Art.

In 1687, he resumed his connection with the theatre by furnishing the music for John Dryden's tragedy Tyrannick Love. In this year, Purcell also composed a march and passepied called Quick-step, which became so popular that Lord Wharton adapted the latter to the fatal verses of Lillibullero; and in or before January 1688, Purcell composed his anthem Blessed are they that fear the Lord by the express command of the King. A few months later, he wrote the music for D'Urfey's play, The Fool's Preferment. In 1690, he composed the music for Betterton's adaptation of Fletcher and Massinger's Prophetess (afterwards called Dioclesian) and Dryden's Amphitryon.  In 1691, he wrote the music for what is sometimes considered his dramatic masterpiece, King Arthur, or The British Worthy . In 1692, he composed The Fairy-Queen (an adaptation of Shakespeare's A Midsummer Night's Dream), the score of which (his longest for theatre) was rediscovered in 1901 and published by the Purcell Society. The Indian Queen followed in 1695, in which year he also wrote songs for Dryden and Davenant's version of Shakespeare's The Tempest (recently, this has been disputed by music scholars), probably including "Full fathom five" and "Come unto these yellow sands". The Indian Queen was adapted from a tragedy by Dryden and Sir Robert Howard. In these semi-operas (another term for which at the time was "dramatic opera"), the main characters of the plays do not sing but speak their lines: the action moves in dialogue rather than recitative. The related songs are sung "for" them by singers, who have minor dramatic roles.

Purcell's Te Deum and Jubilate Deo were written for Saint Cecilia's Day, 1694, the first English Te Deum ever composed with orchestral accompaniment. This work was annually performed at St Paul's Cathedral until 1712, after which it was performed alternately with Handel's Utrecht Te Deum and Jubilate until 1743, when both works were replaced by Handel's Dettingen Te Deum.

He composed an anthem and two elegies for Queen Mary II's funeral, his Funeral Sentences and Music for the Funeral of Queen Mary. Besides the operas and semi-operas already mentioned, Purcell wrote the music and songs for Thomas d'Urfey's The Comical History of Don Quixote, Bonduca, The Indian Queen and others, a vast quantity of sacred music, and numerous odes, cantatas, and other miscellaneous pieces. The quantity of his instrumental chamber music is minimal after his early career, and his keyboard music consists of an even more minimal number of harpsichord suites and organ pieces. In 1693, Purcell composed music for two comedies: The Old Bachelor, and The Double Dealer. Purcell also composed for five other plays within the same year. In July 1695, Purcell composed an ode for the Duke of Gloucester for his sixth birthday. The ode is titled Who can from joy refrain? Purcell's four-part sonatas were issued in 1697. In the final six years of his life, Purcell wrote music for forty-two plays.

Death
Purcell died in 1695 at his home in Marsham Street, at the height of his career. He is believed to have been 35 or 36 years old at the time. The cause of his death is unclear: one theory is that he caught a chill after returning home late from the theatre one night to find that his wife had locked him out. Another is that he succumbed to tuberculosis. The beginning of Purcell's will reads:

Purcell is buried adjacent to the organ in Westminster Abbey. The music that he had earlier composed for Queen Mary's funeral was performed during his funeral. Purcell was universally mourned as "a very great master of music."  Following his death, the officials at Westminster honoured him by unanimously voting that he be buried with no expense spared in the north aisle of the Abbey. His epitaph reads: "Here lyes Henry Purcell Esq., who left this life and is gone to that Blessed Place where only His harmony can be exceeded."

Purcell fathered six children by his wife Frances, four of whom died in infancy. His wife, as well as his son Edward (1689–1740) and daughter Frances, survived him. His wife Frances died in 1706, having published a number of her husband's works, including the now-famous collection called Orpheus Britannicus, in two volumes, printed in 1698 and 1702, respectively. Edward was appointed organist of St Clement's, Eastcheap, London, in 1711 and was succeeded by his son Edward Henry Purcell (died 1765). Both men were buried in St Clement's near the organ gallery.

Legacy

Notable compositions 

Purcell worked in many genres, both in works closely linked to the court, such as symphony song, to the Chapel Royal, such as the symphony anthem, and the theatre.

Among Purcell's most notable works are his opera Dido and Aeneas (1688), his semi-operas Dioclesian (1690), King Arthur (1691), The Fairy-Queen (1692) and Timon of Athens (1695), as well as the compositions Hail! Bright Cecilia (1692), Come Ye Sons of Art (1694) and Funeral Sentences and Music for the Funeral of Queen Mary (1695).

Influence and reputation

After his death, Purcell was honoured by many of his contemporaries, including his old friend John Blow, who wrote An Ode, on the Death of Mr. Henry Purcell (Mark how the lark and linnet sing) with text by his old collaborator, John Dryden. William Croft's 1724 setting for the Burial Service was written in the style of "the great Master". Croft preserved Purcell's setting of "Thou knowest Lord" (Z 58) in his service, for reasons "obvious to any artist"; it has been sung at every British state funeral ever since. More recently, the English poet Gerard Manley Hopkins wrote a famous sonnet entitled simply "Henry Purcell", with a headnote reading: "The poet wishes well to the divine genius of Purcell and praises him that, whereas other musicians have given utterance to the moods of man's mind, he has, beyond that, uttered in notes the very make and species of man as created both in him and in all men generally."

Purcell also had a strong influence on the composers of the English musical renaissance of the early 20th century, most notably Benjamin Britten, who arranged many of Purcell's vocal works for voice(s) and piano in Britten's Purcell Realizations, including from Dido and Aeneas, and whose The Young Person's Guide to the Orchestra is based on a theme from Purcell's Abdelazar. Stylistically, the aria "I know a bank" from Britten's opera A Midsummer Night's Dream is clearly inspired by Purcell's aria "Sweeter than Roses", which Purcell originally wrote as part of incidental music to Richard Norton's Pausanias, the Betrayer of His Country.

In a 1940 interview Ignaz Friedman stated that he considered Purcell as great as Bach and Beethoven. In Victoria Street, Westminster, England, there is a bronze monument to Purcell, sculpted by Glynn Williams and unveiled in 1995 to mark the 300th anniversary of his death. In 2009, Purcell was selected by the Royal Mail for their "Eminent Britons" commemorative postage stamp issue.

A Purcell Club was founded in London in 1836 for promoting the performance of his music but was dissolved in 1863. In 1876 a Purcell Society was founded, which published new editions of his works. A modern-day Purcell Club has been created, and provides guided tours and concerts in support of Westminster Abbey.

Today there is a Henry Purcell Society of Boston, which performs his music in live concert and currently is online streaming concerts, in response to the pandemic. There is a Purcell Society in London, which collects and studies Purcell manuscripts and musical scores, concentrating on producing revised versions of the scores of all his music. Purcell's works have been catalogued by Franklin Zimmerman, who gave them a number preceded by Z.

So strong was his reputation that a popular wedding processional was incorrectly attributed to Purcell for many years. The so-called Purcell's Trumpet Voluntary was in fact written around 1700 by a British composer named Jeremiah Clarke as the Prince of Denmark's March.

In popular culture

Music for the Funeral of Queen Mary was reworked by Wendy Carlos for the title music of the 1971 film by Stanley Kubrick, A Clockwork Orange. The 1973 Rolling Stone review of Jethro Tull's A Passion Play compared the musical style of the album with that of Purcell. In 2009 Pete Townshend of The Who, an English rock band that established itself in the 1960s, identified Purcell's harmonies, particularly the use of suspension and resolution (Townshend has mentioned Chaconne from The Gordian Knot Untied) that he had learned from producer Kit Lambert, as an influence on the band's music (in songs such as "Won't Get Fooled Again" (1971), "I Can See for Miles" (1967) and the very Purcellian intro to "Pinball Wizard"). Purcell's music was widely featured as background music in the Academy Award winning 1979 film Kramer vs. Kramer, with a soundtrack on CBS Masterworks Records. The 1995 film, England, My England, tells the story of an actor who is himself writing a play about Purcell's life and music, and features many of his compositions.

In the 21st century, the soundtrack of the 2005 film version of Pride and Prejudice features a dance titled "A Postcard to Henry Purcell". This is a version by composer Dario Marianelli of Purcell's Abdelazar theme. In the German-language 2004 movie, Downfall, the music of Dido's Lament is used repeatedly as Nazi Germany collapses. The 2012 film Moonrise Kingdom contains Benjamin Britten's version of the Rondeau in Purcell's Abdelazar created for his 1946 The Young Person's Guide to the Orchestra. In 2013, the Pet Shop Boys released their single "Love Is a Bourgeois Construct" incorporating one of the same ground basses from King Arthur used by Nyman in his Draughtsman's Contract score. Olivia Chaney performs her adaptation of "There's Not a Swain" on her CD "The Longest River."

"What Power Art Thou" (from King Arthur, or The British Worthy (Z. 628), a semi-opera in five acts with music by Purcell and a libretto by John Dryden) is featured in The Crown.

Notes

References

Sources

External links

 
 
 
 
 
 
 Purcell's London by Brian Robins
 The Purcell Society
 Short biography, audio samples and images of Purcell
 Monument to Purcell
 Dido's Lament – Research leading to a narrative account of how Henry Purcell's opera Dido and Aeneas was created.
 [ Henry Purcell] at AllMusic
 
 National Trust catalogue entry for manuscript music, copied by Philip Hayes directly from Purcell's original manuscripts
 Select digitized images from Old English Songs, containing works by Purcell, housed at the University of Kentucky Libraries Special Collections Research Center

1659 births
1695 deaths
17th-century classical composers
17th-century English composers
British male organists
English Baroque composers
English opera composers
English classical organists
English male classical composers
Classical composers of church music
Glee composers
Male opera composers
Gentlemen of the Chapel Royal
People educated at Westminster School, London
People from Victoria, London
17th-century deaths from tuberculosis
Tuberculosis deaths in England
Burials at Westminster Abbey
17th-century male musicians
Male classical organists
Articles containing video clips